Ma Hang Chung is one of the 25 constituencies in the Kowloon City District of Hong Kong which was created in 1994.

The constituency loosely covers Jubilant Place and Grand Waterfront in Ma Tau Kok with the estimated population of 20,388.

Councillors represented

Election results

2010s

2000s

1990s

References

Constituencies of Hong Kong
Constituencies of Kowloon City District Council
1994 establishments in Hong Kong
Constituencies established in 1994
Ma Tau Kok